The 1893 Swansea District by-election was a parliamentary by-election held for the House of Commons constituency of Swansea District in Glamorgan in South Wales on 19 June 1893.

Vacancy
The by-election was caused by the elevation to the peerage of the sitting Liberal MP, Henry Vivian.

Candidates
The only candidate who nominated was local businessman William Williams. He was the founder and manager of the Worcester Tinplate Works.

References

1893 elections in the United Kingdom
Elections in Swansea
1893 in Wales
1890s elections in Wales
19th century in Swansea
June 1893 events
History of Glamorgan